Lương Thế Vinh High School for the Gifted (Vietnamese: Trường Trung học Phổ thông Chuyên Lương Thế Vinh) is a high school in Đồng Nai province, Vietnam. It was established in 1994 and named after Lương Thế Vinh. 

The school offers advanced and specialized curriculum for gifted students who show their exceptional talents in the Natural Sciences, Social Sciences, and Humanities.

History 

The school was established in 1994. For the first 3 years, it shared facilities with Ngo Quyen high school. Since 1997, it has had its own facilities, located in Tân Hiệp ward. In 2014, it was rebuild.

References 

High schools for the gifted in Vietnam
High schools in Vietnam
Schools in Vietnam
Educational institutions established in 1994
1994 establishments in Vietnam